Eugenio Rojas Apaza (6 September 1962 – 30 July 2020) was a Bolivian politician who served as Minister of Productive Development and Plural Economy of Bolivia from 2017 to 2019 and as a Senator from 2010 till 2015. 

Rojas died from COVID-19 in La Paz on 30 July 2020, aged 57, during the COVID-19 pandemic in Bolivia.

References

1962 births
2020 deaths
People from La Paz
Members of the Senate of Bolivia
21st-century Bolivian politicians
Deaths from the COVID-19 pandemic in Bolivia